Theater is a former Buffalo Metro Rail station that served the entertainment and theater districts of downtown Buffalo, New York located in the 600 block of Main Street between Chippewa and Tupper Streets at the north end of the Free Fare Zone, where customers traveling north are required to have proof-of-payment.

History
From October 9, 1984 to May 18, 1985, Theater station served as the northern terminus, as Metro Rail officially opened for regular service on May 20, 1985. From May 20, 1985 to November 10, 1986, due to construction issues at LaSalle, Amherst Street served as the northern terminus. Prior to 2005, Theater station served as the southern terminus, as the Taste of Buffalo was held along Main Street between Chippewa and Church Streets (it has since moved to Delaware Avenue between West Chippewa and West Eagle Streets). Since November 10, 1986, University Station serves as the northern terminus. Prior to February 18, 2013, Theater was the last above-ground station, with the subway portal directly north of the station, which caused safety issues partially leading to decision to close rather than relocate the station.

Closure
After 10,359 days in service, Theater station permanently closed on February 18, 2013 in order to be demolished to make way for the return of vehicular traffic to the 600 block of Main Street.

Notable places nearby
Theater station is located near:
 Alleyway Theatre
 Andrews Theatre
 Buffalo United Artists
 Babeville
 Courier Express Building
 Irish Classical Theatre Company
 Market Arcade Building
 AMC Market Arcade 8
 Road Less Traveled Theatre
 Shea's Performing Arts Center
 710 Main Street Theatre
 Trinity Episcopal Church

See also
 List of Buffalo Metro Rail stations

References

Buffalo Metro Rail stations
Railway stations in the United States opened in 1984
Railway stations closed in 2013